Chabab may refer to:
Chabab Riadhi Belouizdad, Algerian football club
Chabab Al Araich, Moroccan football club currently playing in the third division
Chabab Atlas Khénifra, Moroccan football club currently playing in the third division
Chabab Houara, Moroccan football club currently playing in the second division
Chabab Rif Hoceima, Moroccan football club based in Al Hoceima
Chabab Massira, Moroccan football club based in Laayoune (Capital of the Western Sahara)
Chabab Mohammédia, Moroccan football club currently playing in the First division, founded in 1948